Savigny-sur-Grosne (literally Savigny on Grosne) is a commune in the Saône-et-Loire department in the region of Bourgogne-Franche-Comté in eastern France. The composer and choral conductor Charles Ravier (1934–1984) was born in Savigny-sur-Grosne.

Geography
The Guye flows north through the southeastern part of the commune, then flows into the Grosne, which forms most of the commune's eastern border.

See also
Communes of the Saône-et-Loire department

References

Communes of Saône-et-Loire